Mesan (also Romanized as Masan and Mosan; also known as Mīsan and Misan) is a village in Nowjeh Mehr Rural District, Siah Rud District, Jolfa County, East Azerbaijan Province, Iran. At the 2006 census, its population was 205, in 52 families.

References 

Populated places in Jolfa County